&, or ampersand, is a typographic symbol.

& may also refer to:

Music
 & (album), by Julien Doré
 & (Ayumi Hamasaki EP), a 2003 EP by Ayumi Hamasaki
 & (The Moth & The Flame EP), an EP by rock group The Moth & The Flame
 "&", a song by Tally Hall on the 2011 album Good & Evil
 "&", a 2021 EP by Eric Church, released as part of his Heart & Soul triple album
 [&] (Loona EP), a 2021 EP by South Korean girl group Loona

Computing
 Bitwise and
 Operators in C and C++

See also
 Iain Baxter& (born 1936), Canadian conceptual artist
 Ampersand (disambiguation)
 And (disambiguation)